Pretre or Prêtre, meaning priest in French, may refer to :
 Georges Prêtre (1924-2017), a French conductor
 Prêtre Martin, a character who serves the Mass alone to himself
 Amazone De Pretre, another name for the red-spectacled amazon, a parrot species
 John McDonell (Le Prêtre) (1768–1850), a soldier, judge and political figure in Upper Canada
 Sebastien Le Pretre de Vauban (1633–1707), a Marshal of France and the foremost military engineer of his age
 Vingtaine de Bas du Mont au Prêtre, one of the five vingtaines of St. Helier Parish on the Channel Island of Jersey
 Vingtaine de Haut du Mont au Prêtre, one of the five vingtaines of St. Helier Parish on the Channel Island of Jersey

See also
 Pretrei (disambiguation)

French-language surnames
Occupational surnames